Alex Stewart (28 June 1964 – 16 November 2016) was a professional boxer. He represented Jamaica at the 1984 Olympics, and won a bronze medal in the heavyweight division at the 1983 Pan American Games. During his professional career, he fought world champions Mike Tyson, Evander Holyfield, George Foreman, Oleg Maskaev, and Michael Moorer. Known for being a strong finisher, 40 of his 43 career wins came inside the distance.

Amateur career
Stewart was a member of the Jamaican 1984 Olympic team. He was beaten by Sweden's Håkan Brock in the quarter final of the heavyweight competition, losing by a 5–0 decision. A year earlier he won a bronze medal at the Pan American Games. He lost to Michael Bentt in a thrilling match in the 1985 Heavyweight Golden Gloves Finals.

Highlights
 Pan American Games (heavyweight), Caracas, Venezuela, August 1983:
 1/4: Defeated Jorge Dascola (Argentina) KO 1
 1/2: Lost to Aurelio Toyo (Cuba) RSC 2

Olympic Games (heavyweight), Los Angeles, California, August 1984:
 1/16: Defeated Virgilio Frias (Dominicana) KO 2
 1/8: Lost to Håkan Brock (Sweden) 0–5

 National Golden Gloves (heavyweight), 1985:
 Finals: Lost to Michael Bentt

Professional career

Nicknamed "The Destroyer", Stewart did just that in the heavyweight ranks, at least early in his career.  Stewart reeled off 24 consecutive wins, all by KO, prior to his defeat to Evander Holyfield, to whom he lost twice.

Stewart is probably best known for being blown out by Mike Tyson in the first round in 1990 at Trump Plaza in Atlantic City., and lost to other notable heavyweights of his era, including Michael Moorer, George Foreman, and Oleg Maskaev.

Stewart's loss to Foreman is likely his most notable ring performance.  Although Foreman knocked him down twice, Stewart recovered to lose a narrow majority decision to Foreman, in which Foreman was badly swollen about the face.

Retirement and death
After two consecutive knockout losses, Stewart retired from boxing in 1999, and after retiring worked in the New York area for a liquor distributor.  Stewart died in Mount Vernon, New York in November 2016 of a blood clot in his lung.

Professional boxing record

Personal life
Alex Stewart is survived by his wife, Angella Stewart, and his daughter, Ajay-Tenille Stewart, who was born in 1985.

References

External links
 

1964 births
2016 deaths
Boxers from Greater London
English male boxers
Jamaican male boxers
Heavyweight boxers
Olympic boxers of Jamaica
Boxers at the 1984 Summer Olympics
Boxers at the 1983 Pan American Games
Pan American Games bronze medalists for Jamaica
English people of Jamaican descent
Pan American Games medalists in boxing
Medalists at the 1983 Pan American Games